Nagod Assembly constituency is one of the 230 Vidhan Sabha (Legislative Assembly) constituencies of Madhya Pradesh state in central India. This constituency came into existence in 1951, as one of the 48 Vidhan Sabha constituencies of the erstwhile Vindhya Pradesh state, but it was abolished in 1956. It again came into existence in 1966, following the delimitation of the legislative assembly constituencies.

Overview
Nagod (constituency number 64) is one of the seven Vidhan Sabha constituencies located in Satna district. This constituency covers the entire Unchehara tehsil, Nagod nagar panchayat and part of Nagod tehsil of the district.

Nagod is part of Satna Lok Sabha constituency along with six other Vidhan Sabha segments of this district, namely, Chitrakoot, Raigaon, Satna, Amarpatan, Maihar and Rampur-Baghelan.

Members of Legislative Assembly

As from a constituency of Madhya Bharat
 1951: Gopal Saran Singh, Indian National Congress / Het Ram, Indian National Congress

As a constituency of Madhya Pradesh

Election results

2013 results

See also
 Nagod

References

Satna district
Assembly constituencies of Madhya Pradesh